Cymoblemma is a monotypic moth genus of the family Erebidae. Its only species, Cymoblemma crenelata, is found in India and Sri Lanka. Both the genus and the species were first described by George Hampson, the genus in 1926 and the species in 1907.

References

Calpinae
Monotypic moth genera